Robert Judson Aley (May 11, 1863 – July 1, 1935) was an American mathematician and university president. Aley served as the fifth President of the University of Maine from January 1911 to August 1921 and then as President of Butler College in Indiana from 1921 to 1931.

Education and early career
Born in Coal City, Indiana, Aley attended public schools. Aley began his teaching career at the age of 14. After three years of teaching in rural schools, he attended and eventually graduated from Valparaiso University (Bachelor of Science, 1882). He worked as a Principal in Spencer, Indiana after leaving Valparaiso while also studying for a Bachelor of Arts from Indiana University. He earned two degrees from Indiana: a BA in 1888 and Master of Arts in 1890. He was the first person to receive a degree in mathematics from Indiana University. He became a professor of mathematics at Vincennes University from the completion of his BA in 1888 until 1891. He was hired as head of the mathematics department at Indiana in 1891 and continued in that position until 1909. During that period, he did graduate work at Stanford University and earned a PhD in mathematics from the University of Pennsylvania in 1897.

Aley died of pneumonia in 1935 at the age of 72.

Maine
Aley became President of Maine in January 1911. A fervent supporter of United States involvement in World War I, he made attendance mandatory for pro-war events in and near the campus.

References

Further reading

1863 births
1935 deaths
People from Owen County, Indiana
19th-century American mathematicians
Valparaiso University alumni
Indiana University Bloomington alumni
University of Pennsylvania School of Arts and Sciences alumni
Vincennes University faculty
Indiana University faculty
Presidents of the University of Maine
Presidents of Butler University
20th-century American mathematicians